Aethes destituta is a species of moth of the family Tortricidae. It was described by Razowski in  1983. It is endemic to Iran.

References

destituta
Endemic fauna of Iran
Moths described in 1983
Taxa named by Józef Razowski
Moths of Asia